The 11th Parliament of Upper Canada was opened on 7 January 1831. Elections in Upper Canada had been held in October 1830, and all sessions were held at York, then later at Toronto. This parliament was dissolved on 1 September 1834.

The House of Assembly had four sessions, from 7 January 1831 to 6 March 1834.

Both the House and Parliament sat at the old York Court House on King Street until 1832 and moved to the third Parliament Buildings of Upper Canada for the remaining session.

See also
Legislative Council of Upper Canada
Executive Council of Upper Canada
Legislative Assembly of Upper Canada
Lieutenant Governors of Upper Canada, 1791-1841
Historical federal electoral districts of Canada
List of Ontario provincial electoral districts

References

Further reading 
Handbook of Upper Canadian Chronology, Frederick H. Armstrong, Toronto : Dundurn Press, 1985. 

Parliaments of Upper Canada
1831 establishments in Upper Canada
1834 disestablishments in Upper Canada